Soul of Things is an album by Polish jazz trumpeter and composer Tomasz Stańko recorded in 2001 and released on the ECM label.

Reception
The Allmusic review awarded the album 4 stars.
Number 97 in Jazzwise's "The 100 Jazz Albums That Shook the World" list on December 7, 2021.

Track listing
All compositions by Tomasz Stańko.

 "Soul of Things I" - 5:41
 "Soul of Things II" - 8:00
 "Soul of Things III" - 4:23
 "Soul of Things IV" - 5:12
 "Soul of Things V" - 5:44
 "Soul of Things VI" - 5:02
 "Soul of Things VII" - 5:48
 "Soul of Things VIII" - 3:23
 "Soul of Things IX" - 8:08
 "Soul of Things X" - 6:15
 "Soul of Things XI" - 6:56
 "Soul of Things XII" - 5:08
 "Soul of Things XIII" - 5:11

Personnel
Tomasz Stańko - trumpet
Marcin Wasilewski - piano
Slawomir Kurkiewicz - bass
Michal Miskiewicz - drums

References

ECM Records albums
Tomasz Stańko albums
2002 albums
Albums produced by Manfred Eicher